Events from the year 1857 in Ireland.

Events
27 March – 24 April: General election.
12 July – in Belfast, confrontations between crowds of Catholics and Protestants turn into 10 days of rioting, exacerbated by the open-air preaching of Evangelical Presbyterian minister "Roaring" Hugh Hanna, with many of the police force joining the Protestant side. There are also riots in Derry, Portadown and Lurgan.
4 October – the Catholic St. Mary's Cathedral, Kilkenny, is opened.
The Natural History Museum is opened by the Royal Dublin Society.
Dublin Zoo's lions breed for the first time.
Scrabo Tower erected above Newtownards as a memorial to Charles Vane, 3rd Marquess of Londonderry (d. 1854).
Tom Gallaher sets up the Gallaher tobacco business in Derry.

Arts and literature

Sport

Births
7 February – Windham Wyndham-Quin, 5th Earl of Dunraven and Mount-Earl, peer and politician (died 1952).
12 February – Margaret Pearse, Fianna Fáil politician, mother of Patrick Pearse and Willie Pearse (died 1932).
11 March – Tom Clarke, nationalist, rebel and organiser of the Easter Rising (executed 1916).
17 April – Jane Barlow, poet and novelist (died 1917).
19 April – Patrick Stone, Member of the Western Australian Legislative Assembly (died 1942 in Australia).
20 April – Thomas Myles, surgeon, Home Ruler, involved in importation of arms for the Irish Volunteers in 1914 (died 1937).
22 April (probable year) – Ada Rehan, actress (died 1916 in the United States).
1 May – T. W. Rolleston, writer, poet and translator (died 1920).
19 May – William Morgan Jellett, Irish Unionist MP in the Parliament of the United Kingdom (died 1936).
11 July – Joseph Larmor, physicist (died 1942).
1 August – Alan Joseph Adamson, politician in Canada (died 1928).
22 August – William Dowler Morris, mayor of Ottawa (died 1931).
5 October – Peadar Mac Fhionnlaoich, Irish language writer (died 1942).
1 November
 W. H. Grattan Flood, musicologist and historian (died 1928).
 John Joly, physicist (died 1933).
18 November – Stanhope Forbes, painter (died 1947 in the United Kingdom).
20 November – Sir Henry Robinson, 1st Baronet, civil servant (died 1927).

Deaths
29 January – John Connors, soldier, recipient of the Victoria Cross for gallantry in 1855 at Sebastopol in the Crimea (born 1830).
3 March – William Brown, creator and first admiral of the Argentine Navy (born 1777).
9 April – Charles McCorrie, soldier, recipient of the Victoria Cross for gallantry in 1855 at Sebastopol, in the Crimea (born 1830).
11 July – John Egan, businessman and politician in Ottawa (born 1811).
27 July – Laurence F. Renehan, priest and historian (born 1797).
10 August – John Wilson Croker, statesman and author (born 1780).
19 September – John Purcell, soldier, recipient of the Victoria Cross for gallantry in 1857 at Delhi, India, later killed in action (born 1814).
23 September – John Nicholson, military hero in India (born 1822).
17 December – Francis Beaufort, hydrographer and officer in the British Royal Navy,  creator of the Beaufort scale (born 1774).

References

 
1850s in Ireland
Ireland
Years of the 19th century in Ireland
 Ireland